Isaiah 35 is the thirty-fifth chapter of the Book of Isaiah in the Hebrew Bible or the Old Testament of the Christian Bible. This book contains the prophecies attributed to the prophet Isaiah, and is one of the Books of the Prophets. This is the final chapter in a group (chapters 28–35) which the Jerusalem Bible calls a collection of "poems on Israel and Judah". The New King James Version entitles this chapter "The Future Glory of Zion".

Text 
The original text was written in Hebrew language. This chapter is divided into 10 verses.

Textual witnesses
Some early manuscripts containing the text of this chapter in Hebrew are of the Masoretic Text tradition, which includes the Isaiah Scroll (1Qlsa; 356-100 BCE), Codex Cairensis (895 CE), the Petersburg Codex of the Prophets (916), Aleppo Codex (10th century), Codex Leningradensis (1008).

There is also a translation into Koine Greek known as the Septuagint, made in the last few centuries BCE. Extant ancient manuscripts of the Septuagint version include Codex Vaticanus (B; B; 4th century), Codex Sinaiticus (S; BHK: S; 4th century), Codex Alexandrinus (A; A; 5th century) and Codex Marchalianus (Q; Q; 6th century).

Parashot
The parashah sections listed here are based on the Aleppo Codex. Isaiah 35 is a part of the Prophecies about Judah and Israel (Isaiah 24–35). {P}: open parashah; {S}: closed parashah.
 {S} 35:1-2 {P} 35:3-10 {S}

Analysis
This chapter shares similar imagery as later parts of Isaiah (chapters 40–66, such as:
 God's glory (verse 2; cf. Isaiah 40:5)
 Opening the eyes of the blind and healing the lame (verses 5–6; cf. Isaiah 40:5; Isaiah 42:7
 Promise of a highway through the desert (verse 8ff; cf. Isaiah 40:3; 62:10)

Verse 1
 The wilderness and the solitary place shall be glad for them; and the desert shall rejoice, and blossom as the rose.
A midbar is an area that receives less than twelve inches of rain per year and may have some pasturage (if receiving six to twelve inches of rain), but often has desert-like qualities. A tsiyyah does not refer to 'a sandy desert per se', but among the three terms 'most clearly indicates a dry, desert region'. The "rift valley" includes the Jordan Valley, yet 'it still has a reputation as a dry, desolate place from its conditions near the Dead Sea and southward'.
"Rose": is translated from the Hebrew word ḥăḇatzeleṯ, that occurs two times in the scriptures, beside in this verse also in Song of Songs 2:1, and rendered variously as "lily" (Septuagint "κρίνον", Vulgate "lilium", Wiclif "lily"), "jonquil" (Jerusalem Bible) and "crocus" (RSV)

Verse 5
 Then the eyes of the blind shall be opened,
 and the ears of the deaf shall be unstopped.
Jesus cited this verse in claiming these prophecies to himself, when he spoke to the disciples of John the Baptist as recorded in Matthew 11:4, 5. Jesus performed the miracles of giving sight to the blind people multiple times, providing the proof that 'he was the Messiah sent from God' (Matthew 9:27; Matthew 20:30; Mark 8:23; Mark 10:46; Luke 7:21).

Verse 6
Then shall the lame man leap as an hart, and the tongue of the dumb sing: for in the wilderness shall waters break out, and streams in the desert.
"The lame man leap as an hart": Compared to the healing of lame men by Christ or by Peter.

Verse 10
And the ransomed of the LORD shall return, and come to Zion with songs and everlasting joy upon their heads: they shall obtain joy and gladness, and sorrow and sighing shall flee away.
"The ransomed of the Lord shall return": from Hebrew: , ū-  , "And_the_ransomed of_Yahweh shall_return"; in combination with the last phrase of verse 9: "and the redeemed will walk, the ransomed of the Lord will return."
"On their heads": from Hebrew: , -, "[will be] on their head[s]"; NET: "will crown them". "Joy" here is likened to a crown (cf. ), which may also be 'an ironic twist on the idiom "earth/dust on the head" (cf. 2 Samuel 1:2; 13:19; 15:32; Job 2:12), referring to a mourning practice'.
"And sorrow and sighing shall flee away" (KJV/NKJV): from Hebrew: , wə-  wa-, "and_shall_flee_away sorrow and_sighing or "grief and groaning will flee"; NET: "grief and suffering will disappear".
The theme of "sorrow and sighing" can be linked to the elaboration in Isaiah 65.

Uses

Music
The Catholic theologian Friedrich Dörr based an Advent song, "Kündet allen in der Not", on verses from this chapter.

The King James Version of verses 5–6 from this chapter are cited as texts in the English-language oratorio "Messiah" by George Frideric Handel (HWV 56).

See also
Carmel
Lebanon
Miracles of Jesus
Sharon
Related Bible parts: Matthew 9, Matthew 11, Matthew 12, Matthew 20, Matthew 21, Mark 7, Mark 8, Mark 9, Mark 10, Luke 7, Luke 11, John 9, Acts 3, Acts 14

Notes

References

Sources

External links

Jewish
Isaiah 35 Hebrew with Parallel English

Christian
Isaiah 35 English Translation with Parallel Latin Vulgate 

35